Freedom Tower (also called the St. Regis Hotel Tower) is a skyscraper located in front of the Diana Fountain roundabout at Paseo de la Reforma 439, Colonia, Cuauhtémoc, Delegación Cuauhtémoc in Mexico City. Its construction began in November 2004 and completed in January 2008. The tower started operating in June of that same year. The building has a commercial area on the third floor, and a seven-level underground parking garage with a capacity for 2,000 cars.

As of 2010, the Freedom Tower was the second tallest building in Paseo de la Reforma and the ninth tallest in Mexico City.

The tower consists of a hotel and various luxury residences. This is the first building belonging to the St. Regis Hotel & Residences in Latin America.

The architect of this skyscraper was the Argentinian Cesar Pelli, creator of the Petronas Towers in Kuala Lumpur - the highest building in the world until the year 2004. In Mexico City he previously designed the Twin Towers of Polanco called the Forest Residence 1, the Forest Residence 2, and the Coca-Cola Building in 1995.

Form 
The building reaches to 150.1 meters at its spiral. The height to the top floor is 138.3 meters, and up to the roof it reaches 144.5 meters. The building has 32 floors; the floor to ceiling height of each floor is four meters.

The building is equipped with 15 high speed elevators that move at a speed of 6.6 meters per second. In addition it has three pressurized emergency escalators, automatic units for air conditioning, and mechanical and electrical and facilities on each floor. Each floor has an average area of 1,750 to 1,825 square meters, free of columns. The total area of the building is 78.900 square meters. The site was formerly used as a public parking lot.

It is sometimes referred to as the vase building due to its construction and external appearance.

Important Details 
The initial project (and official name) is Freedom Tower, but it is now commonly known as the St. Regis Tower.

Because of the high seismic activity observed in Mexico city, prior to its construction, a highly advanced seismic engineering study was conducted. This allowed the designers to isolate it properly and protect the building from the common earthquakes that happen in the city. 
To do this, the structure is anchored to the surface of the earth and supported by 225 concrete piles, which penetrate to a depth of 55 meters passing the marshy land into firmer ground. The building is also equipped with 65 seismic shock absorbers. With this, it can withstand an earthquake up to 8.5 degrees on the Richter scale. On April 13, 2007 it withstood an earthquake of 6.3 on the Richter scale. Also, in June 2009 another one of 6.4 intensity on the Richter scale. 
The tower can also resist winds up to 257 kilometers per hour. The glass panes used to build it have a thickness of 2.3 centimeters.

There are only 13 St. Regis Hotel & Residences in the world. The tower is now one of the safest skyscraper in the world along with: Mayor Tower, Pemex Executive Tower, Mexico World Trade Center, Latinamerican Tower, HSBC Tower, Mexicana Airlines Tower, Tower Insignia and Lomas Tower. Axis is in the middle of the triangle of the three tallest skyscrapers of downtown Mexico City that are 'Torre Mayor', 'Torre Ejecutiva Pemex "and" Torre Latinoamericana ". Note that the Freedom Tower skyscraper is one of the newest additions to Paseo de la Reforma Avenue along with, Edificio Reforma 222 Torre 1, Reforma 222 Financial Center, Magenta Tower, HSBC Tower, Edificio Reforma 243, Florence Tower, and Reforma Tower.

Intelligent Building 
The St. Regis Tower is managed by the Building Management System (BMS), an intelligent system that controls all the facilities and equipment in a smoothly and efficiently way. It has the objective of protecting human life of the residents, guest and occupants. This BMS system has integrated the following utilities: electric, hydro-sanitary, elevator and fire protection; with the additional ability to control the lighting of the building at all times.

It is considered an intelligent building because the lighting system is controlled by a system called B3, also found in buildings such as Torre Mayor, Torre Ejecutiva Pemex, Mexico World Trade Center, Torre Altus, Arcos Bosques, Arcos Bosques Corporativo, Torre Latinoamericana, Edificio Reforma 222 Torre 1, Haus Santa Fe, Edificio Reforma Avantel, Residencial del Bosque 1, Residencial del Bosque 2, Torre del Caballito, HSBC Tower, Panorama Santa Fe, Santa Fe City Tower Amsterdam, Santa Fe Pads, Reforma 222 Financial Center, and Torre Lomas between others.

It has a water-saving automatic system, the first system of this kind in Mexico, and is therefore considered a green building.

It also has automatic elevators that will find the floors with the highest flow of people. An automatic air-handler is located in each level to supply the right air-temperature balance.

The building has the following systems: 
- generation system and chilled water distribution
- energy saver
- variable air volume (air-handling units and preparations of high-speed pipeline at every level of office)
- general health extraction system office at every level
- mechanical ventilation system
- mechanical extraction system trash room
- air conditioning system mini-split type automatic for control room, administration, sales and boardroom.

Fire Alarm System 

All public areas including basements for parking, have sprinkler system and smoke detectors connected to the central system of the intelligent building. In addition, to complement the system hose cabinets are installed, with a dry chemical extinguisher ABC type of 6 kilograms.

Fume Extraction System 

In the room were installed: a jockey pump to maintain pressure, an electrically powered pump for service provision, and a pump with an internal combustion engine for the emergency service. All boards and accessories for the operation of fire fighting are fully automatic and connected to the tower.

Quick Facts 
Its height is 152 meters. It has a total floor area of 125.000 m². The rooms occupy 78.900 m². There are 7 levels of underground parking. The reinforced concrete structure consists of 31.000 cubic meters of concrete, 12,000 tons of structural steel and reinforcement, and 65 seismic shocks.

External links

References

 

César Pelli buildings
Skyscraper hotels
Skyscrapers in Mexico City
Mexico City
Hotel buildings completed in 2009
Residential skyscrapers in Mexico
Hotels in Mexico City